Admiral Rodney's Pillar (Welsh: Pilar Rodney) is a monument on Breidden Hill in Powys, Wales. It was built in 1781–82 to commemorate the naval victories of Sir George Brydges Rodney, Admiral of the White during the American War of Independence. 
A granite panel states that it was erected by the "Gentlemen of Montgomeryshire" to commemorate the naval successes of Admiral Rodney including the Battle of the Saints. The pillar is a conspicuous landmark around the Upper Severn Valley and is a Grade II* listed building.

An inscription in Welsh, which had disappeared by 1890, translated as ". The highest pillar will fall, the strongest towers will decay: but the fame of Sir George Brydges Rodney shall increase continually, and his good name shall never be obliterated."

Conservation
In the 21st century the monument was reported to be in need of restoration work. By late 2019, cracks had appeared in the monument and a copper lightning conductor had been stolen from its top. Restoration work was valued at £160,000.

A charity group 'Save Rodney's Pillar' was formed with the purpose of raising funds to aid in the restoration of the monument. The charity estimated that up to £200,000 was needed in order to restore and preserve the monument. 

As of June 2022, the monument has been fenced off pending restoration work.

See also
Admiral Hood Monument

References

Grade II* listed buildings in Powys
Grade II* listed monuments and memorials in Wales
Monuments and memorials in Powys
Buildings and structures completed in 1782